Ligustrum japonicum, known as wax-leaf privet or Japanese privet is a species of Ligustrum (privet) native to central and southern Japan (Honshū, Shikoku, Kyūshū, Okinawa) and Korea. It is widely cultivated in other regions, and is naturalized in California and in the southeastern United States from Texas to Virginia.

Description
L. japonicum is an evergreen shrub or small tree growing to —rarely —tall, with smooth, pale grey-brown bark on the stems. The leaves are opposite, 5–10 cm long and 2–5 cm broad, glossy dark green above, paler glaucous to yellowish green below, thick and leathery textured, and with an entire margin. The flowers are white, with a four-lobed corolla 5–6 mm long; they are borne in clusters 7–15 cm long in early summer. The fruit is an oval drupe, 10 mm long, ripening purple-black with a glaucous waxy bloom in early winter; in Japan they are popularly likened to mouse or rat droppings. The species is closely related to the Chinese Ligustrum lucidum, differing in its smaller size (L. lucidum making a tree to over 10 m tall), and elongated oval (not subglobose) fruit.

Cultivation and uses
The fruit is used in herbal medicine as a cardiotonic, diuretic, laxative and tonic treatment.

The plant arrived in North America in the early 1800s and has become an invasive plant, particularly in the American South.
It is occasionally grown as an ornamental plant in Europe and North America; a number of cultivars have been selected for garden use, including 'Rotundifolium' with leaves nearly as broad as long, and 'Silver Star' with creamy-white margins to the leaves.

Etymology
Ligustrum means 'binder'. It was named by Pliny and Virgil.

Gallery

References

Further reading
 

japonicum
Flora of Japan
Flora of the Ryukyu Islands
Plants described in 1780
Trees of Korea
Flora of Taiwan
Flora of China
Garden plants of Asia